Rabbi Avraham Jacobovitz (1952) is an Israeli-born Charedi rabbi, who founded Machon L'Torah and Jewish Awareness America (JAAM), to educate Jewish college students about Jewish heritage and values.

Early life
Born in 1952 in Tel Aviv to Hagaon Rav Yehuda Jacobovitz זצ"ל and Mrs. Sheina Dvora ע"ה, the young Avraham Jacobovitz studied in the Slabodka yeshiva of Bnei Brak, under the tutelage of Hagaon Rav Mordechai Shulman זצ"ל.

At the age of seventeen, his family moved to Brooklyn, where his father gave the semicha shiur in the Mirrer Yeshiva.

A few years later, R' Avraham married Bayla, a daughter of the famed mohel Hagaon Rav Moshe Bunim Pirutinsky זצ"ל.

Learning in Kollel
After spending a few years in the Mirrer kollel, the young couple moved to Detroit, where Rabbi Jacobovitz studied in the Kollel Institute of Greater Detroit.

It was in Detroit where the Rosh Kollel Rabbi Moshe Schwab זצ"ל encouraged Rabbi Jacobovitz to enter the kiruv world.

Career of Kiruv
Starting with shiurim in the Kollel's basement, in the summer of 1980, Rabbi J. (as he is affectionately known) founded Machon L'Torah, the Jewish Learning Network of Michigan.

Throughout the years, Machon flourished to be a world-class kiruv organization, where Rabbi Jacobovitz lectured to college students throughout Michigan, primarily at the University of Michigan in Ann Arbor, and Michigan State University in East Lansing. As a result, hundreds have found their faith, and became baalei teshuva. He has also become an expert on the topic of intermarriage, and has authored a book titled Perfect Strangers: Redefining Intermarriage.

Machon also had a weekly Shabbos minyan, which started in Rabbi Jacobovitz's private basement. Following Mussaf, Rabbi Jacobovitz teaches a few halachos from the Kitzur Shulchan Aruch.

In the summer of 1988, Machon purchased its own building in Oak Park, Michigan, and the minyan moved there. A Sunday morning 9:00 AM Shacharis was added in the new building. (Prior to the purchase of the new building, Machon held its Sunday morning minyan at Rav Leizer Levin זצ"ל's shul, "Beth Tefilo Emanuel Tikvah" in Southfield.)

In 2001, Rabbi Jacobovitz founded Jewish Awareness America (JAAM), whose aim is to produce knowledgeable future Jewish leaders who will help out assimilated college students.

In 2004, Rabbi Jacobovitz launched the Yeshivalite program project, a uniquely designed Yeshiva for individuals who desire to gain learning skills and experience the Yeshiva life in a warm environment with caring, focused, and high caliber staff. It is specifically tailored for those with a limited time period in which to accomplish the above. After its initial extraordinary success in the summer of 2005, this project offers more options and a further improved curriculum.

In 2010, Rabbi Jacobovitz announced that his family will be making Aliyah (moving to Israel) in the summer, to continue his kiruv efforts in Eretz Yisrael. Rabbi Jacobovitz currently lives in Ramat Bet Shemesh and is active in giving classes there.

Rabbi Jacobovitz is known for his unique take on classic Jewish tunes, as well as for coining the phrase "Hoidu LaHashem Ki Toiv" (הודו לה' כי טוב) as a substitute for the familiar "Baruch Hashem" reply to questions such as "How are you?".

References

External links
 Machon L'Torah - The Jewish Learning Network of Michigan
 JAAM - Jewish Awareness AMerica

1952 births
Living people
Israeli Orthodox rabbis
People from Tel Aviv
Mir Yeshiva alumni